"Cold Stones" is the 76th episode of the HBO original series The Sopranos and the 11th of the show's sixth season. Written by Diane Frolov, Andrew Schneider, and David Chase, and directed by Tim Van Patten, it originally aired on May 21, 2006.

Starring
 James Gandolfini as Tony Soprano
 Lorraine Bracco as Dr. Jennifer Melfi 
 Edie Falco as Carmela Soprano
 Michael Imperioli as Christopher Moltisanti
 Dominic Chianese as Corrado Soprano, Jr. *
 Steven Van Zandt as Silvio Dante
 Tony Sirico as Paulie Gualtieri
 Robert Iler as A.J. Soprano 
 Jamie-Lynn Sigler as Meadow Soprano
 Aida Turturro as Janice Soprano Baccalieri *
 Steven R. Schirripa as Bobby Baccalieri
 Frank Vincent as Phil Leotardo
 Sharon Angela as Rosalie Aprile
 Joseph R. Gannascoli as Vito Spatafore
 Dan Grimaldi as Patsy Parisi

* = credit only

Guest starring

Synopsis

Carmela discovers that A.J. was fired from his job and has kept this a secret for three weeks. Tony watches as A.J. types on a chatroom and giggles; disgusted, he tells Dr. Melfi that he hates his son. She points out that Tony wishes his mother had protected him as Carmela protects A.J. Tony finds A.J. a construction job and gently encourages him to "do good". But when A.J. resists him, Tony smashes the windshield of A.J.'s car, warning, "Don't put me to the test."

Meadow tells her parents she is moving to California to be with Finn.

Carmela visits Paris with Rosalie. She reacts to the ancient city with emotional intensity, and thoughts about past and future, life and death. In a dream she sees Adriana walking her dog by the Eiffel Tower; a gendarme says in English, "Your friend—someone needs to tell her she's dead."

Vito approaches Tony at a mall and tries to convince him he is not really homosexual. He asks to buy his way back into the crew, proposing to run a business in Atlantic City involving prostitution and meth trafficking. Tony brings up the offer with Silvio, Christopher, and Paulie, who are not in favor. Vito has a reunion lunch with his family, telling his children that he has been working as an undercover spy in Afghanistan and that they must never speak about his return. He phones Jim, who rebuffs him.

Tony has already had a business dispute with Phil, who is now the acting boss of the Lupertazzi family. When they meet again, Phil is angry that Vito is back in town. Tony decides that he can't keep protecting Vito and begins planning his murder. However, when Vito returns that night to his motel room, he is ambushed by New York mobsters Fat Dom Gamiello and Gerry Torciano, who knock him down and duct-tape his mouth. Vito mutely pleads for his life as Phil comes out of the closet and watches Dom and Gerry beat him to death with pool cues.

Tony understands that Phil is sending a message, that he can kill one of Tony's capos and Tony cannot do anything about it. He decides to hit back at Phil financially, noting that he has "a wire room in Sheepshead Bay."

While Sil and Carlo are at Satriale's, Dom arrives to make a payment and starts making crude jokes about Vito. When he begins to joke that Carlo and Vito were involved romantically, Sil and Carlo impulsively attack and kill him. Tony shows up, sees what has happened, and wordlessly exits, leaving Sil and Carlo to deal with the corpse.

When Vito's murder is reported in the newspaper, Francesca and Vito, Jr. learn about their father's occupation and homosexuality.

Title reference
 "Cold Stones" could refer to the ruins, the statues, and the old buildings that Carmela sees in Paris.
 "Cold Stones" could also refer to AJ's new construction job, which he begins in winter.

Final appearances
 Jim Witowski – Owner of a local diner in Dartford, New Hampshire, and Vito's ex boyfriend.

Deceased
 Vito Spatafore: Beaten to death with a pool cue by Dominic "Fat Dom" Gamiello and Gerry Torciano on orders from Phil Leotardo.
 Dominic "Fat Dom" Gamiello: Stabbed to death by Carlo Gervasi while being held by Silvio Dante in the back room of Satriale's.

Production
 During the shoot in Paris, Edie Falco had the flu which rendered her voice almost inaudible. Sharon Angela had difficulty reacting to Carmela's dialogue when filming the scenes, and Carmela's lines had to be replaced in post-production with Falco recording them only once she had gotten well, already back in the U.S.
 Sharon Angela is billed in an individual credit during the opening sequence for the only time. For other episodes, she is paired with another cast member. This may be due to her key role in this episode. 
 The motel where Vito is beaten to death was filmed on location at the former Howard Johnson's motor lodge in Fort Lee, New Jersey.
 Carmela believes that Adriana left Christopher but her dream suggests that Adriana is dead. In Season 2, Tony's dream reveals the truth about Big Pussy working with the FBI, and in Season 5 a dream indicates that he will need to kill his cousin, Tony Blundetto.
 The Star-Ledger article reporting Vito's death contains more text than was read out by Vito Jr. to his sister. DVD freeze frame reveals that the same paragraphs are just repeated over and over with the exception of the last. The final paragraph is unique and mentions that the owner of the Fort Lee Motel where Vito is murdered is a Fort Lee resident named Miriam Shapiro who was unavailable for comment.
 Former series regular member Drea de Matteo makes her final appearance as Adriana La Cerva in this episode.

References to prior episodes
 Carmela mentions the time A.J. was being nihilistic and denying God's existence at the time of his confirmation, which happened in the season 2 episode "D-Girl."
 Carmela mentions the time she and Rosalie planned to travel to Italy ("The Knight in White Satin Armor").
 Carmela reads about Abelard and Heloise in her Paris guidebook and then thinks for a second. Robert Wegler prominently talked to Carmela about a book about Abelard and Heloise in the season 5 episode "Sentimental Education."
 Carmela remembers what Tony spoke immediately after he woke up from his coma: "Who am I? Where am I going?" ("Join the Club").
 In Carmela's dream, Adriana tells her that she found her dog Cosette (in the afterlife). Cosette was accidentally killed in the season 4 episode "The Strong, Silent Type."

Other cultural references
 When he and his crew are in the Bing, Tony points out Mickey Rooney on TV as a very hyper band leader in the movie Strike Up the Band.
 In the same scene above, Paulie mentions how ashamed "Salvatore Lucania" would probably be of him and his cohorts. Lucania was the birth name of iconic Mafia boss Charles Lucky Luciano.   
 When Carmela tells Tony about her plans to visit Paris, he is watching Is Paris Burning? (1966) on television. Later, when Carmela calls from Paris, Tony jokes, "Is Paris burning?" When he hears it's been raining over there, he replies "When it drizzles!", a line from the 1953 Cole Porter song "I Love Paris."
 Tony calling Phil "Carnac the Great" is a reference to Carnac the Magnificent, a comedic, soothsaying character played by Johnny Carson during his tenure as host of The Tonight Show.
 The sights seen in Paris besides the Eiffel Tower: The taxi is driving Carmela and Rosalie on the Champs-Elysees towards the Arc de Triomphe. Later, Notre Dame Cathedral is shown in the background. The Palais-Royal gardens and the Pont Alexandre III bridge are visited. The church where the candles were lit is St. Eustache. The women have dinner at Le Grand Véfour restaurant. Rosalie consoles Carmela at the Thermes de Cluny. Additionally, Carmela says they should visit the Louvre.
 Rosalie Aprile sees a ferry in the Seine and says, "Look! Just like Charade!"
 Silvio Dante reacts to the repeated news of Vito's death by responding that Carlo Gervasi is a "regular Jimmy Olsen," a reference to Superman's photographer friend at the Daily Planet.
 Tony tells Silvio that "Joe Bananas" fought a Mafia war with Carlo Gambino of retribution killings for seven or so years.

Music
 "Summer Rain" by Gritty Kitty plays as Vito and Marie Spatafore talk while their kids skate at the Rockefeller Center.
 "Ouvre Les Yeux" by PM (from their 2000 album Les Petits Chefs), a French rap group from the Paris suburbs, plays during the first scene in Paris.
 "Knights in White Satin" by Giorgio Moroder is played while Tony is in the Bada Bing!
 "Back In Black" by AC/DC is playing on the car radio while Tony is receiving fellatio from a stripper while driving. That song was followed immediately by Lynyrd Skynyrd's "Simple Man" as Tony speaks to Vito on the phone.
 The melody to "La Vie En Rose" is hummed by Rosalie as she consoles Carmela at the Gallo-Roman baths.
 The ringtone of "Fat Dom"'s phone is Für Elise by Ludwig van Beethoven.
 "Home" by Persephone's Bees plays at the beginning of the credits.
 "As Time Goes By" from Casablanca plays through the rest of the closing credits. The city of Paris plays an important role in both Casablanca and this episode. This particular rendition is sung by Dooley Wilson.

References

External links
"Cold Stones"  at HBO

2006 American television episodes
The Sopranos (season 6) episodes
Television episodes written by David Chase
Television episodes directed by Tim Van Patten